Varick D. Smith, (born November 30, 1979), better known as Smitty, is an American rapper and hip-hop ghostwriter from Little Haiti, a neighborhood in Miami, Florida.

Biography

While growing up in Miami, Varick came home one day to find a friend deceased due to an unforeseen incident. The incident made him more aware of his future. In 1997 he decided to enroll at Florida A&M University to major in journalism. However, his aspiration to become a full-fledged artist led him to switch coasts after only two and half years of school. He would eventually, through a friend, get the opportunity to start in the hip-hop industry by flying out to meet with famed producer Dr. Dre while he was filming The Wash. After many hours waiting around on set, Varick finally got the chance to rap in front of Dr. Dre. Dr. Dre was impressed and Varick was asked to work on a few tracks for The Wash soundtrack. He is also a good basketball player.

In addition to working on the soundtrack, Varick wrote two Billboard Hot 100 chart-toppers, "Shake Ya Tailfeather" by P. Diddy, Nelly & Murphy Lee for which he won a Grammy for Best Performance at the 2004 awards and "Bump, Bump, Bump" by B2K. He also has collaborated with fellow hip-hop artists such as Trick Daddy, Scarface,  Kanye West, T.I., and BMG.

In 2011 Smitty reunited with Breyon Prescott, producer of such acts as Jamie Foxx, Angie Stone, Dr. Dre, Sean Garrett and Brandy. Smitty and Prescott teamed up with Sean Garrett, Bink and Mississippi newcomer Tito Lopez in 2012 to put the finishing touches on Dr. Dre's highly anticipated Detox album. Smitty has a co-writing credit on Rick Ross's 3Kings featuring Dr. Dre and Jay Z.

Smitty has also written songs for Snoop Dogg, Brandy, Pharrell and his longtime mentor Diddy, who is featured on his new street banger, Money Hungry, which dropped in September 2012.
In 2015 Smitty wrote with legendary producer Dr. Dre on the Straight Outta Compton movie soundtrack and in that same year was a ghost writer on several projects produced by Timbaland. He then worked with Pras of the Fugees on their up-and-coming highly anticipated album. In addition to working on the Fugees new project, Smitty co-wrote with producer Bink for West Coast rapper E-40.

Record deals
Opportunities to sign with Aftermath Records, Arista Records, Capitol Records, Def Jam, Elektra Records, and Jive Records were all offered, but were turned down in lieu of creative freedom. Smitty eventually signed with Clive Davis' J Records in 2003.

In April 2008, Smitty parted ways with J Records, according to an interview with WordofSouth.com.  He is now signed with Blackground/Interscope,  and will be releasing his debut in the near future.

Discography
In July 2005, Smitty released his debut single effort "Diamonds on My Neck", which charted at Billboard charts; a music video was directed by Hype Williams and a mixtape hosted by DJ EFX. His second single, "Died in Your Arms Tonight", failed to chart. However the remix with T-Pain seemed to be a hit on the YouTube website. A debut album, Life of a Troubled Child, was scheduled for release in late 2005 but was shelved.  He released three mixtapes, The Voice of the Ghetto, Heart of the South, and Bigger Than Life. Recently Smitty did a record with rapper T.I. called "Mind On My Money". On October 13, 2010, Smitty released a new single entitled "Burr" and guest-starred in DJ King SamS "U Never No" forthcoming album with Mario Winans, Bobby Valentino, Red Café, Young Buck, NORE, Junior Reid and others.

References

External links
 

African-American male rappers
Living people
Southern hip hop musicians
Rappers from Miami
21st-century American rappers
21st-century American male musicians
1979 births
21st-century African-American musicians
20th-century African-American people